Sollia is a village in Stor-Elvdal Municipality in Innlandet county, Norway. Sollia Church is located in the long, narrow village. The County Road 219 runs through the small village. Historically, this village was the administrative centre of the old Sollia Municipality.

Name
The first element is sol which means "the Sun" and the last element is the finite form of li which means "hillside". Thus, the name means "the sunny hillside".

References

Stor-Elvdal
Villages in Innlandet